Ouyang Ziyuan (born 9 October 1935) is a Chinese cosmochemist, geochemist and space advocate. He is a research professor at the Institute of Geochemistry of the Chinese Academy of Sciences. Asteroid 8919 Ouyangziyuan, discovered in 1996, was named in his honor.

Career 
Ouyang was born in 1935 in Ji'an, Jiangxi. He obtained a degree in geology at the Beijing College of Geology and a doctorate in mineral deposits and geochemistry at the Beijing Institute of Geology. Thereafter, Ouyang spent many years conducting studies in deep mines. He later studied nuclear physics and worked in a particle accelerator laboratory. He later put forward a hypothesis of the formation of iron meteorites, an evolutionary model of the formation of the meteorites which fell at Jilin in 1976, and a theory of multi-stage cosmic ray radiation history. His works include Celestial Chemistry, and he has published more than 160 scientific treatises. He was elected a Member of the Chinese Academy of Sciences in 1991.

Space advocacy 
As an expert in geological research on underground nuclear tests and extraterrestrial materials, Ouyang was among the first to advocate not only the exploitation of lunar reserves of metals such as iron, but also the mining of lunar helium-3, an ideal fuel for nuclear fusion power plants. Ouyang is now the chief scientist of the Chinese Lunar Exploration Program (CLEP), also known as the Chang'e program. He is the most prominent supporter of the Chinese manned lunar exploration program, and also lobbies for the Chinese exploration of Mars.

On November 12, 2008, upon China's publication of a comprehensive lunar surface map, Ouyang encouraged all three Asian nations then involved in lunar exploration (China, India and Japan) to increase co-operation in furthering humanity's understanding of the Moon.

See also
 Chinese space program

References

External links
 Chinese Academy of Sciences lunar exploration-related articles

1935 births
Living people
Chemists from Jiangxi
China University of Geosciences alumni
Chinese geochemists
Educators from Jiangxi
Academic staff of Fudan University
Members of the Chinese Academy of Sciences
Academic staff of Nanjing University
People's Republic of China politicians from Jiangxi
Planetary_scientists
Space program of the People's Republic of China
Academic staff of Peking University
Politicians from Ji'an
Academic staff of the University of Science and Technology of China
Academic staff of Zhejiang University